Shams al-Ḥaqq ibn Muḥammad ʿAbd Allāh ibn Chirāgh ʿAlī al-Farīdfūrī, or simply known as Shamsul Haque Faridpuri (189621 January 1969) was an Islamic scholar, educationist, and social reformer. He was the founder-principal of Jamia Qurania Arabia Lalbagh. He also founded many other madrasas and mosques. Organisations which he initiated include; Khademul Islam Jamat and Anjuman-e-Tabligh-al-Quran.

Early life and family 
Faridpuri was born on a Friday in the year 1896, to a Bengali Muslim family in the village of Ghoperdanga (later Gawhardanga) in erstwhile Faridpur District, Bengal Presidency, British Raj (now Gopalganj District, Bangladesh). He traces his paternal ancestry to an Arab soldier who was one of the members of Bakhtiyar Khalji's army during his conquest of Bengal. His ancestors settled in Jessore where they propagated Islam to locals with his great-great grandfather, Mawlana Abdul Awwal al-Ghazi, relocating the family to Faridpur. His father, Muhammad Abdullah ibn Chiragh Ali, was a munshi and participant of the Indian Rebellion of 1857, and his mother, Amena Khatun, was a housewife. Faridpuri's great-grandfather, Chand Ghazi, was a student of Syed Ahmad Shaheed and took part in the Battle of Balakot against the Sikhs.

Education
Faridpuri first began his preschool education under the local Hindu pandit of Patgati. He then studied in Tungipara and Sutiakathi School where he completed his primary education. In 1915, he was the best performer for class 6 in the annual exams at the Baghariya High School in Noapara. He then joined for class 7 at the Calcutta Alia Madrasa and in 1919 he passed the entrance exam for the Anglo-Persian department. With a scholarship, Faridpuri enrolled at the Presidency College Calcutta for a few days before being interrupted by Mahatma Gandhi's non-cooperation movement. As a result, Faridpuri left the college and set off for Thana Bhawan where he met Ashraf Ali Thanwi. Under Thanwi's advice, Faridpuri enrolled at the Mazahir Uloom seminary in Saharanpur where he completed Islamic studies up to a bachelors level. He then moved on to study at Darul Uloom Deoband where he studied tasawwuf under Thanwi and hadith under Anwar Shah Kashmiri, Izaz Ali Amrohi and Hussain Ahmed Madani until 1927. Faridpuri also gained khilafat from Zafar Ahmad Usmani and Abdul Ghani.

Career 

After completing his education, Faridpuri returned to his homeland in Bengal where he became a prominent teacher of hadith. He became the principal of Jamia Islamia Yunusia in Brahmanbaria in 1928 until 1935 when he founded the Gazalia Madrasa in Bagerhat. He then moved on to Ashraful Uloom in Bara Katara, Dhaka from 1936 until 1950. He founded the Jamia Islamia Darul Uloom Khademul Islam in his home village of Gawhardanga in 1937. In 1940, he founded Khademul Islam Jamat (Congregation of the Guardians of Islam), an organisation which promoted the implementation of Islamic ideals. He also founded the Anjuman-e-Tabligh-al-Quran (Association of Quranic Preaching) to challenge the activities of Christian Missionaries that were actively propagating to Muslims in the region. Faridpuri was an advocate of campaigns such as the Pakistan Movement and the Tablighi Jamaat. The Idaratul Ma`arif was a centre for Islamic research that was established by Faridpuri. From 1951 up until his death, he taught hadith classes in Jamia Qurania Arabia Lalbagh. He also founded the capital's Jamia Arabia Imdadul Uloom in Faridabad in 1956.

Bibliography

Writings 
 Shotru Theke Hushiar Thako(); English translations: Beware of the enemy
 Choritro Gothon; English translations: Character Development
 Potito Pabon; Fallen wind
 Ma-Bap O Shontaner Hoq; English translations: Rights of the parents and children
 Tafsire Sura Fateha; English translations: Exegesis of Surah al-Fatiha
 Taubanama O Jiboner Pon; English: The story of repentance and the stake of life  
 Allahr Porichoy O Manusher Porichoy; English translations: God's background and mankind's background 
 Matri Jatir Morjada; English translations: The dignity of matriarchs
 Mosjid O Jibonto Mosjid; English translations: Mosque and living mosques
 Hoqqani Tafsir; (completed but not fully published yet) - only the first and last Juz were published but the author completed the manuscript of the Tafseer in approximately 16000 pages and urged his students to published it but no one has taken up the task of the continuation of the publication yet)
 Dhormer Ashol Uddeshyo Ki?; English translations: What is the main goal of religion?
 Oshot Alem O Peer Ebong Shotorko Bani; English: The dishonest alim and pir and words of warning
 Tasauof Totto; English translations: Inquiry of Mysticism
 Bhul Shongshodhon; English translations: Emendation of Mistakes
 Quraner Upor Hostokhep Bordasht Kora Jabe Na; English: Interference against the Quran will not be tolerated
 Shongkkhepe Islam; English translations: Islam in short
 Namazer Ortho; English translations: The meaning of prayer
 Hajjer Masail; English: The topic of Hajj
 Halal-Haram O Bidat-Ijtihad; English: Halal-haram and bid'ah-ijtihad
 Proloyongkari Ghurnijhorer Karon Ki?; English translations: What is the reason behind catastrophic cyclones? Tabligh O Islami Zindegi; English: Tabligh and Islamic life Votarer Dayitto O Vote Shomporke Shorioter Nirdesh; English translations: Responsibilities of the voter and instructions for voting from the Sharia Adorsho Muslim Poribar O Shushthu Porikolpona; English: Ideal Muslim family and elegant plans Rozar Fazilat;  English: Virtue of Fasting Islahe Nafs; English: Soul reformation Jibon Patheyo; English Viaticum of life Dhormo O Rajneeti; English: Religion and politics Hadiser Rotno-Bhandar Ba Shashon Poddhoti; English: The gem-stores of Hadith or ruling method Jihader Gurutto O Fazilat; English: Importance and virtue of Jihad''

Translations 
 Sahih Al Bukhari
 Bahishti Zewar

See also 
 Jamia Qurania Arabia Lalbagh

References

External links 
 Bhul Shongshodhon [Correction of Mistakes of Allama Maududi] by Maulana Shamsul Haque Faridpuri

20th-century Muslim scholars of Islam
Deobandis
1896 births
1969 deaths
Burials at Azimpur Graveyard
People from Gopalganj District, Bangladesh
Bengali Muslim scholars of Islam
Bangladeshi Sunni Muslim scholars of Islam
Bangladeshi people of Arab descent